Archbishop Gaetano Cossa, C.R. (died 1657) was a Roman Catholic prelate who served as Archbishop of Otranto (1635–1657).

Biography
Gaetano Cossa was ordained a priest in the Congregation of Clerics Regular of the Divine Providence.
On 28 February 1633, he was selected as Archbishop of Otranto and confirmed on 7 May 1635 by Pope Urban VIII.
On 13 May 1635, he was consecrated bishop by Francesco Maria Brancaccio, Cardinal-Priest of Santi XII Apostoli, with Giacomo Theodoli, Bishop of Forlì and Alessandro Suardi, Bishop of Lucera, serving as co-consecrators. 
He served as Archbishop of Otranto until his death in 1655 or 1657.

Episcopal succession

References 

17th-century Italian Roman Catholic archbishops
Bishops appointed by Pope Urban VIII
1657 deaths
Theatine bishops